South Carolina Western Railway Station, also known as the Seaboard Airline Railway Station, is a historic train station located at Darlington, Darlington County, South Carolina.  It was built in 1911 by the South Carolina Western Railway and is a rectangular brick building with projecting rectangular bays at the center of two sides. The hipped roof features a bell-cast profile, red clay tile, wide bracketed eaves, and intersecting gables.  Each gable contains a Palladian window. Lawrence Reese, an African-American master carpenter who had constructed many houses in Darlington, built the station.

It was listed on the National Register of Historic Places in 1988.

References

Railway stations on the National Register of Historic Places in South Carolina
Railway stations in the United States opened in 1911
National Register of Historic Places in Darlington County, South Carolina
Darlington, South Carolina
Former Seaboard Air Line Railroad stations
Former railway stations in South Carolina